The 2020–21 F.C. Crotone season was the 111th season in the club's history. After two seasons in Serie B, Crotone returned to the top division of Italian football. In addition to Serie A, Crotone participated in this season's edition of the Coppa Italia. The season covered the period from 3 August 2020 to 30 June 2021.

Players

First-team squad
.

Other players under contract

Out on loan

Pre-season and friendlies
On 19 August 2020, Crotone announced a squad of 19 players who would take part in training in Trepidò.

Competitions

Overview

Serie A

League table

Results summary

Results by round

Matches
The league fixtures were announced on 2 September 2020.

Coppa Italia

Statistics

Appearances and goals

|-
! colspan=14 style=background:#DCDCDC; text-align:center"| Goalkeepers

|-
! colspan=14 style=background:#DCDCDC; text-align:center"| Defenders

|-
! colspan=14 style=background:#DCDCDC; text-align:center"| Midfielders

|-
! colspan=14 style=background:#DCDCDC; text-align:center"| Forwards

|-
! colspan=14 style=background:#DCDCDC; text-align:center"| Players transferred out during the season

Goalscorers

References

External links

F.C. Crotone seasons
Crotone